The 2011 J. League Cup Final was the 20th final of the J. League Cup competition. The final was played at Tokyo National Stadium in Tokyo on 29 October 2011. The match was contested between the Urawa Red Diamonds who were defeated by the Kashima Antlers in extra time.

Route to the final

Urawa Red Diamonds

Kashima Antlers

Match

Assistant referees:
Haruhiro Otsuka
Tadaomi Aiba
Match Rules
90 minutes.
2 halves of extra-time if necessary.
Penalty shootout if scores still level.
Seven named substitutes.
Maximum of 3 substitutions.

See also
2011 J.League Cup

References

J.League Cup
2011 in Japanese football
Kashima Antlers matches
Urawa Red Diamonds matches